Henry John Reuben Dawson-Damer, 3rd Earl of Portarlington  (5 September 1822 – 1 March 1889) was an Irish peer.

On 17 November 1841, he was commissioned a cornet in the Dorsetshire Yeomanry. He became Earl of Portarlington in 1845 on the death of his uncle John Dawson, 2nd Earl of Portarlington and resigned his Yeomanry commission in November 1848. The Earl was appointed a Knight of the Order of St Patrick on 8 February 1879. He married Lady Alexandrina Octavia Maria Vane, second daughter of Charles Vane, 3rd Marquess of Londonderry.

References

1822 births
1889 deaths
Irish representative peers
Knights of St Patrick
Queen's Own Dorset Yeomanry officers
Earls of Portarlington
Dawson-Damer family